Ampangan is a mukim in Seremban District, Negeri Sembilan, Malaysia. It is possible that Ampangan comes from the Malay word "Empangan" which means dam. Ampangan has a pasar malam (night market) on every Tuesday and Friday evening. People in the surrounding areas dubbed it as Pasar Malam Ampangan. According to some people the night market has been operating since the 1970s. The night market offers varieties of Malaysian delicacies mostly Malay traditional kuih (deserts). For example:

Apam balik 
Murtabak
Nasi goreng 
Keropok lekor 
Satay
Kuih Lepat Pisang
Kuih Lapis
Kuih Kacang
Mee Hailam Arimaz
Roti Telur Kentang

Apart from Pasar Malam Ampangan, there is a shopping centre for the community in the surrounding areas. The shopping centre is called Plaza Angsana and there is a supermarket with a Giant Hypermarket.

There are two technical schools, Sekolah Menengah Teknik Tuanku Jaafar and Sekolah Menengah Teknik Ampangan.  There are also two primary schools, Sekolah Kebangsaan King George V and Sekolah Kebangsaan Ampangan.

Transportation
Jalan Jelebu Federal Route 86serves the northern end of Ampangan while Jalan Seremban-Kuala Pilah Federal Route 51 serves the southern end of Ampangan. LEKAS Highway also serves Ampangan at EXIT 2106 Ampangan.

References

Mukims of Negeri Sembilan
Seremban District